The 2003 Bristol City Council election took place on 1 May 2003, on the same day as other local elections in the UK. The Labour Party made a number of losses, mainly to the Liberal Democrats, and lost overall control of the council. Loses included Council leader Diane Bunyan, who lost her Windmill Hill seat to the Liberal Democrats. This year also saw elections contested by the new Bristolian Party, founded by the local 'scandal sheet' The Bristolian, though they failed to win any seats.

Ward results

Ashley

Bedminster

Bishopsworth

Brislington East

Brislington West

Cabot

Clifton

Clifton East

Cotham

Easton

Eastville

Filwood

Frome Vale

Hartcliffe

Hengrove

Hillfields

Knowle

Lawrence Hill

Southville

St George East

St George West

Stockwood

Whitchurch Park

Windmill Hill

References

2003 English local elections
2003
2000s in Bristol